Acta Linguistica Asiatica is a peer-reviewed academic journal covering research on languages of Asia, their translation and teaching. It is published by Ljubljana University Press.

Abstracting and indexing
The journal is abstracted and indexed in:
Index Islamicus
MLA International Bibliography
Scopus

References

External links

Asian studies journals
Multilingual journals
Biannual journals
Creative Commons Attribution-licensed journals
Linguistics journals
Publications established in 2010